Bishop Bay – Monkey Beach Conservancy is a conservancy in British Columbia, Canada. It is 3,374 hectares in size and is accessible only by floatplane or boat. It features boat anchorage and tent platforms as well as a hotspring fed bath house. The temperature of the hotsprings is approximately 41.3 degrees Celsius at the source and about 38.8 degrees Celsius in the bath house. It is located 25 km east of Hartley Bay and 75 km south of Kitimat. The conservancy was established in 2006, with Monkey Beach being added to the conservancy in 2007.

References

External links

Conservancies of British Columbia
North Coast of British Columbia